The Cousin from Nowhere is a 1953 West German operetta film directed by Karl Anton and starring Vera Molnar, Gerhard Riedmann and Grethe Weiser. It was shot at the Wiesbaden Studios in Hesse and on location around Markgröningen, Tübingen, Bietigheim and Bad Urach. The film's sets were designed by the art directors Erich Kettelhut and Max Vorwerg. It is based on the 1921 operetta The Cousin from Nowhere composed by Eduard Künneke.

Cast

References

External links

West German films
German musical films
1953 musical films
Operetta films
Films based on operettas
Films directed by Karl Anton
Remakes of German films
German black-and-white films
Films scored by Eduard Künneke
1950s German films